Leucisca is a genus of crabs in the family Leucosiidae. The genus is endemic to South Africa.

Species
Species in the genus include:
 Leucisca levigena George & M. Clark, 1976
 Leucisca rubifera (Müller, 1887)
 Leucisca squalina MacLeay, 1838

References

Crabs